The name Aetheria may refer to:
Aetheria (mythology), one of the Heliades, daughters of Helios in Greek mythology
Egeria (pilgrim), also known as Etheria, Eucheria, or Silvia, known for writing the Peregrinatio Ætheriæ, Itinerarium Egeriae, or Peregrinatio ad Loca Sancta
A synonym for the moth genus Hecatera
Ætheria, one of the classical albedo features on Mars
 Aetheria: first abbess of Notre-Dame de Soissons (658)